DeQuina Moore is an American actress, best known for her role as Pilar in the original Broadway cast of Legally Blonde: The Musical. She is a native of Houston, Texas.

Filmography
Camp (2003) as DeQuina
The Warriors (2005) as Additional Soldier
Rachel Getting Married (2008) as Rachel's Stylist
Ghost Town (2008) as Young Wife
Joyful Noise (2012) as Devonne

Stage credits

References

External links 

Living people
Year of birth missing (living people)
21st-century American actresses
Actresses from Texas
Actresses from Houston
People from Houston